Paolo Canevari (born Rome, 1963) is an Italian contemporary artist. He lives and works in New York City.
Canevari presents highly recognizable, commonplace symbols in order to comment on such concept as religion, the urban myths of happiness or the major principles behind creation and destruction.

Career
Between 1989 and 1990 he lived in New York where he has his first solo show Rocce. In the 1990s he exhibited in numerous group shows in Los Angeles at the art gallery of Otis Parsons College of Art and Design, in Paris, in Kiev at the Soros Center for Contemporary Art, Vienna at the Vienna Secession, Frankfurt, in Dublin at the IMMA Irish Museum of Modern Art, Geneva, Taiwan, Liege as well as in Bologna, Rome, Milan, Prato, Naples, Spoleto, Venice.

In 1999 the participation in the XIII Quadriennale Palazzo delle Esposizioni Roma.
In the next years his work is featured in numerous solo exhibitions. In 2000 in Rome at the Galleria Stefania Miscetti and in Bangkok Center for Academic Resources, Chulalongkorn University. In 2001 in Paris at the Galerie Cent8 and in Siena at the Palazzo delle Papesse Centro Arte Contemporanea. In Milan in the Galleria Christian Stein in 2002, 2005 and 2010. In 2002 the publisher Charta devoted a monograph with essays by Andrea Camilleri, Mario Codognato, Doris von Draten, Chrissie Iles and Valerio Magrelli to Canevari.

In 2004 the solo project "Welcome to Oz" at the Center for Contemporary Art PS1, New York curated by Alanna Heiss and the show “A Couple of Things I Have to Tell You” in the Sean Kelly Gallery, New York. In 2006 the solo project “Rubber Car” in the MART – Museo d’Arte contemporanea di Trento e Rovereto and the participation in “The Peace Tower Project” in the Whitney Biennial at the Whitney Museum of American Art. In 2007 the solo show “Nothing from Nothing” curated by Danilo Eccher at the MACRO, Museo d’Arte Contemporanea Roma, for the show a catalog is published by Electa with text by Danilo Eccher, Alanna Heiss, Klaus Biesenbach, Chrissie Iles. In 2007 Canevari participates at the 52nd Biennale Internazionale di Venezia curated by Robert Storr with the video "Bouncing Skull" which will become in 2008 part of the MoMA permanent collection in New York. Other solo exhibitions in 2008: “Decalogo” at the Calcografia Nazionale, Istituto per la Grafica Roma, MoMA New York “Raw-War” curated by Klaus Biesenbach.

In 2010 the solo show “Nobody Knows” curated by Germano Celant at the Centro per l’Arte Contemporanea Luigi Pecci, Prato, in occasion of the show Electa published a comprehensive monograph curated by Germano Celant. Also in 2010 the show “Odi et Amo” at the GNAM Galleria Nazionale d’Arte Moderna Rome. In 2011 the solo show “Decalogo” at The Drawing Center, New York.In 2014 Out of Left Field, 4th Quadrilateral Biennial, Museum of Modern and Contemporary Art, Rijeka, Croatia. In 2015 Arts&Foods. Rituals since 1851, curated by Germano Celant. Triennale Milano. In 2016 he took part in the show Challenging Beauty– Insights of Italian Contemporary Art, Curated by Lorand Hegyi at the Parkview Green Contemporary Art Museum, Pechino, China.
In 2018 the participation in the first Bangkok Biennale and in November of the same year his drawings are part of Andrea Camilleri book’s “Turkey don’t thank”.
Paolo Canevari works are part of private and public collections including: Centro per l’arte Contemporanea Luigi Pecci, Prato, MoMA Museum of Modern Art, New York. Foundation Louis Vuitton pour la Creation, Paris. Cisneros Fontanals Art Foundation, Miami. Macro Museo d’Arte Contemporanea Roma. MART Museo d’Arte Contempornea di Trento e Rovereto. Johannesburg Art Gallery, Johannesburg. Istituto Nazionale per la Grafica Calcografia Nazionale, Roma. Perna Foundation, Capri. Olnick Spanu Art Program Garrison NY. 
From 2011  Canevari undertook the “Monuments of the Memory” series; a piece of research based upon the traditional mediums of painting, sculpture and drawing.

Exhibitions
 Canevari has presented his work at major institution worldwide, including: 
 the XIII Esposizione la Quadriennale d’Arte - Rome in 2000
  - Siena in 2001
 the Center for academic Resources - Chulalongkorn University - Bangkok in 2001
 the Liverpool Biennial in 2004
 the Johannesburg Art Gallery - Contemporary Art Museum - Johannesburgin 2005
 the Kunst-Werke Institute for Contemporary Art - Berlin in 2006
 P.S.1 Center for Contemporary Art - New York in 2004/2007
 the MART Museo d’Arte Moderna e Contemporanea - Rovereto in 2005
 the Macro, Museo d’Arte Contemporanea - Rome in 2007
 the 52ma Esposizione Internazionale d’Arte la Biennale di Venezia, Venice in 2007
 the Istituto Nazionale per la Grafica, Rome in 2008
 the MoMA New York in 2008, (his video Bouncing Skull is part of the permanent collection).
In 2010 Germano Celant curated a mid carrier retrospective at Centro per l'Arte Contemporanea Luigi Pecci, Prato, also in 2010 his solo show at the Galleria Nazionale d’Arte Moderna e contemporanea di Roma.

References

External links
 
 moma.org
 gnam.beniculturali.it

1963 births
Living people
Italian contemporary artists